Kyaw Soe (born on 16 October 1944) is a former Deputy Minister for Science and Technology, after his appointment on 15 November 2004. He was previously the Director General of Department of Technical and Vocational Education.

References

1944 births
Government ministers of Myanmar
Foreign ministers of Myanmar
Living people
Place of birth missing (living people)
Union Solidarity and Development Party politicians